Sawan Airlines was an airline company that provided flights between Iraq's cities Erbil and Sulaimaniyah and some cities in Europe.

In Kurdish, "sawan" means "newborn". The name was chosen to recognize the airline was the first Kurdish airline in Iraqi history.  The airline was formed by a group of private Kurdish investors, headed by Kawa Besarani, intending to end the isolation of the Kurdish region of Iraq, which required traveling through Baghdad or travelling through Turkey, Iran or Syria.  The airline used leased aircraft with Greek or German crews.

The first flight from London's Stansted Airport to Erbil took place on October 26, 2005.  By 2006, plans were made for flights from Amsterdam to Sulaimaniyah.

References

Defunct airlines of Iraq
Airlines established in 2005
Airlines disestablished in 2006
Defunct charter airlines
Iraqi companies established in 2005
2006 disestablishments in Iraq
Erbil